Pleasant Mountain is a ski resort located in Bridgton, Maine, in Cumberland County.

Located on the northern end of Pleasant Mountain, the resort features two base areas and 245 skiable acres.  Pleasant Mountain first opened on January 23, 1938 and is the oldest major ski area in Maine. From 1988 until 2022, the area was known as Shawnee Peak.

History
The first trails on Pleasant Mountain were developed by local community groups in 1935. Two years later with assistance from the Works Progress Administration, the town added a rope tow, which opened to the public in January 1938.

In 1988, the ski area was acquired by the owners of Shawnee Mountain Ski Area in Pennsylvania. Pleasant Mountain was subsequently renamed Shawnee Peak to mirror the name of its sister property. After Shawnee Mountain Corporation sold the resort in the early 1990s, new owners considered restoring the original name but ultimately decided against it.

On October 21, 2021, Shawnee Peak was purchased by Boyne Resorts, with the purchase finalized on October 22. Shawnee Peak joins Sugarloaf, Sunday River, and Loon Mountain as Boyne's fourth resort in New England, and third property in Maine. Boyne restored the resort's original name, Pleasant Mountain, on September 14, 2022.

Terrain and Lifts

Serving mainly intermediate and Advanced trails, Pleasant Mountain is split up into 3 distinct areas. Those areas (from left to right) are the Sunnyside Area, the front face, and the Pine beginner area. Most of trails on the mountain can be accessed by taking the Summit Triple. The trails Sunset Boulavard, Haggetts, Jack Spratt, and Pine Slope all start from the top of the Summit Triple and bring you over to the beginners area, while Appalachian, Roosevelt, Yee Haw, and Upper Kanc trails can bring you over to the Sunnyside area.

Pleasant Mountain also has 4 chairlifts, and 2 magic carpets.

Night skiing

Pleasant Mountain has 19 trails for all abilities lit for night skiing.

Photos

References

External links
Shawnee Peak – Official site

Ski areas and resorts in Maine
Buildings and structures in Bridgton, Maine
Tourist attractions in Cumberland County, Maine